Hosho can refer to several things:

, launched in 1868
, launched in 1921
Medals of Honor (Hōshō), several medals awarded by the Government of Japan
Hōshō (Noh school), school of Noh theatre
Hosho (instrument), a Zimbabwean musical instrument
Fuyo Hōshō, a son of Uija, the last king of Baekje